Darkstalkers, known in Japan as , is a fighting game series and media franchise created by Capcom. The first game, Darkstalkers: The Night Warriors, was released in arcades in 1994. The series is set in a pastiche gothic horror universe with characters based on monsters from international folklore, and features a stylized 2D graphic style. Darkstalkers introduced gameplay concepts used in later Capcom fighting games, including the Street Fighter Alpha and Marvel vs. Capcom series.

Besides video games, the Darkstalkers media franchise also includes an anime miniseries, an American cartoon TV series, a Canadian comic book series, and many books of various kinds and other media released only in Japan. Some individual characters, such as Morrigan and Felicia, appeared in later Capcom games, as well as in a few crossover games released by other companies.

Video games

Original arcade games 
The Darkstalkers series is composed of five arcade games from which all subsequent games are based on.

Ports, remasters, and compilations

Future 
Capcom producer Yoshinori Ono said in 2007: "Personally, I'd love to make a new Marvel vs. Capcom, and I'd also like to see the triumphant return of Darkstalkers to a new generation of technology. It would be an interesting challenge with Darkstalkers, because in the old games you'd see a lot of really interesting animations as characters would morph into different forms. That would be tricky to do with this 3D engine, but not impossible. In two or three years, if I got the chance to resurrect that series, I'd like to shock Hollywood with how good the graphics would look". In August 2010, Ono stated during an interview about Street Fighter X Tekken that a new installment to the series would be his "ultimate dream", but only fan demand would cause it to happen. He went on to say that it would take one million requests before Keiji Inafune, then head of research and development at Capcom, would comply. At that point, Capcom had received 5,000 requests. By March 2011, Ono reported that Capcom had received over 100,000 requests. He later expressed during an interview at a Nintendo 3DS launch in London that "one day, if it goes half a million, Capcom may raise its eyebrow a little bit and I could do what I did in London in 2007 when I announced the comeback of Street Fighter. In the near future, with your help, it may become true. It's on its way, because we're pretty much where we were with Street Fighter a few years back. So keep it up".

At 2011 San Diego Comic-Con in July, Ono revealed during the Street Fighter X Tekken panel that while a new Darkstalkers title had not been approved, he reassured the series' fans that "Darkstalkers is not dead". He then proceeded to take a photo of the attendees at the panel holding up their money to send to decision makers at Capcom to show support for the game. Later the following year in June, a message "Darkstalkers are not dead" appeared in a trailer for the PlayStation Vita version of Street Fighter X Tekken; when asked about it, Ono wrote on his Twitter: "I can't announce about Darkstalkers yet". Ono later teased the presence of Darkstalkers at a panel for Street Fighter'''s 25th Anniversary Celebration at San Diego Comic-Con in July. Instead of taking a photo to send proof of demand to Capcom's upper management like he had done in the past, he stated: "This year, you don't have to do that, and it's not necessarily bad news!", but refrained himself from saying anything else.

Following the announcement of Darkstalkers Resurrection at 2012 New York Comic-Con in October, a concept trailer was shown during Capcom's Street Fighter 25th Anniversary panel. Darkstalkers Resurrection producer Derek Neal and Yoshinori Ono told interviewers that the re-release bundle was the first step towards revitalizing the franchise. Neal also claimed that Capcom is using Darkstalkers Resurrection as a test to gauge audience interest in a new Darkstalkers installment. In April 2013, Capcom senior vice president Christian Svensson wrote: "We've not given up. But I'm disappointed in the opening sales response relative to any other fighting title we've put out on the same platforms given the frequency and urgency of requests we've had here over the last several years and the quality of the execution. It is the most fully featured and probably best project of this type we've done. And before people jump to the wrong conclusions, I'm not blaming fans who did buy it and supported the brand. I'm very thankful for those guys (thank you, to all of you). I'm more disappointed by my misread of the information in this particular case". There was no "Darkstalkers are not dead" line at San Diego Comic-Con 2013. Matt Dahlgren, Capcom's new fighting game manager, said that because "Darkstalkers Resurrection did not perform as well as we would have liked. You never know what the future may hold, but Street Fighter is definitely not dead. There is nothing Darkstalkers on the immediate horizon for sure".

Plot
The Darkstalkers games take place on the planet Earth that is in the process of merging with a realm known as Makai. The reason for this merger varies depending on the continuity, but a continuing theme is that the union of realms brings the arrival of the Darkstalkers to the human world, the term being a catch-all for the various creatures of legend. The greatest of these supernatural creatures, and the greatest among those who hunt them, meet in battle to determine who will rule the night.

In the original game and the sequel, Vampire Hunter (Night Warriors: Darkstalkers' Revenge), an alien overlord named Pyron returns to Earth after being away for many years. His quest to conquer the world using an army of robots brings the Darkstalkers out of hiding to oppose his rule over humanity and the supernatural. A second sequel, Vampire Savior (Darkstalkers 3), saw the debut of Jedah, previously one of the nobles of Makai, who decides that the only way to save the realm is to take control of it by force. Accordingly, he lures the Darkstalkers into a trap to use their collective souls to remake the realm and control both humanity and the supernatural.

CharactersDarkstalkers characters are either based on various iconic literary and cinematic monsters, or inspired by international mythology and fairy tales. The 1997 anime miniseries Night Warriors: Darkstalkers' Revenge, which was based on the first two titles, was faithful to the characters' in-game personalities. The 1995 American-produced cartoon series, simply titled Darkstalkers, dropped the backstory of the games altogether in favor of a standard good-versus-evil plot, altering certain characters' storylines in the process.

Related media
Japanese animated seriesNight Warriors: Darkstalkers' Revenge (originally titled  in Japan) is a four-episode OVA anime series by Madhouse Studios under license from Capcom, directed by Masashi Ikeda and originally released in 1997–1998.

American animated seriesDarkstalkers (also known as Darkstalkers: The Animated Series) is an American children's animated TV series produced by Graz Entertainment and aired in syndication from September to December 1995. It was only loosely based on the games and ran for one season of thirteen episodes.

Comic booksDarkstalkers is a Canadian comic book series created by UDON Comics and originally published through Devil's Due Publishing.

Manga books
There are many Darkstalkers manga books and series (including yonkoma parodies). A few of them were also published in North America:
 A manga adaptation authored by Run Ishida and published in Japan by ASCII in 1996. This manga was adapted by Viz Comics under the title of Night Warriors: The Comic Series and published in 1998 as a six-issue comic book which were later collected in a single trade paperback volume.
 A one-shot Red Earth crossover manga Darkstalkers / Red Earth: Maleficarum authored by Mami Itou in 1997. It was released in English by UDON Comics in 2010.

Other books
Multiple other books (guide books, art books, illustrated books, and novels) were published as well, mostly in Japan only. However, some of them were also published in North America:
 In 2008, UDON released the Darkstalkers Graphic File, a collection of screenshots, storyboards and concept art from the series.
 In 2009, UDON released a 15th anniversary art book Darkstalkers Tribute. It consists of submitted artwork from fans of the series, along with artwork from some of UDON and Capcom's own artists and several famous manga artists such as Yasuhiro Nightow. The book was first available in August at several anime conventions before being widely released the following September.
 In 2014, UDON released a 20th anniversary art book Darkstalkers Official Complete Works that "collects the artwork of every Darkstalkers game, including key visuals, character illustrations, promotional artwork, rough concepts, and creator commentary", as well as "multiple new interviews with the creators behind the series, plus all-new tribute pin-ups" from Capcom artists.

Soundtracks
Soundtrack CDs for Darkstalkers games were released in Japan under different record labels including Sony Records, Suleputer and Victor Entertainment. A collection of original tracks from the games, previously included as a part of Vampire Sound Box in Japan, was released digitally by Sumthing Else Music Works in 2014.

PachisloVampire (ヴァンパイア) is a pachislo game using the license of Capcom's fighting game Darkstalkers announced on May 12, 2009 and released on July 6, 2009. The game was released by the Capcom subsidiary, Enterrise (エンターライズ, Entarāizu) utilizing a slot machine style featuring the cast of the original Darkstalkers game, Darkstalkers: The Night Warriors, although the game's website utilized artwork from Darkstalkers 3 along with new secondary characters exclusive to only this title.

Reception

Despite its limited commercial success, Darkstalkers was very well received by critics and acquired a sizable cult following. Destructoid's Kyle Mac Gregor described it as "beloved", and IGN's Richard George described it as both "obscure and beloved". According to MTV, although Darkstalkers "has developed a loyal fanbase over the years, it was never enough for the developer/publisher to give the series much attention". Including Darkstalkers in their list of video game franchises "founded on boobs", GamesRadar US called it "second only to Final Fantasy as an object of Japanophilic cosplaying figurine collector worship. While the character design in immensely cool, some of the fan art is downright disturbing". Keith Stuart of The Guardian ranked the series fourth in his 2012 top list of vampiric video games, citing its "beautiful visuals and superb animation".

GamesRadar's Lucas Sullivan ranked Darkstalkers first on his 2012 list of "obscure" fighting games deserving an HD remake, opining it "offers just as much 2D fighting goodness as the venerable Street Fighter series, but it's never gotten the same kind of respect ... and that just ain't right". UGO.com included Darkstalkers on their 2010 list of the games that need sequels. Complex writers put Darkstalkers at number 40 in their 2012 ranking of best video game franchises, adding that they would "love to see a modern incarnation", and listed a hypothetical Darkstalkers 4 among the 15 games they wished would be announced at E3 2011. The magazine's Andrew Hayward ranked Darkstalkers first on his 2011 list of most missed fighting franchises, stating that "every time Capcom announces a new fighting game, the hardcore community gets whipped up about Darkstalkers'' continual absence, and demands a modern iteration. The supernatural 2D franchise wasn't a big hit, but fervent fans have kept its name alive and seem unwilling to let it fade away".

References

External links

Darkstalkers series at MobyGames
Hardcore Gaming 101 retrospective

Darkstalkers
Video game franchises introduced in 1994
Fighting video games by series
1996 manga
Capcom franchises
Fantasy video games
Horror video games
Trilogies
Video games adapted into comics
Video games adapted into television shows
Video games about vampires
Fighting games
2D fighting games
Video game franchises
Viz Media manga